Bogo is a commune in Diamaré Department, Cameroon. In 2005, the population was recorded at 21,046.

See also
Communes of Cameroon

References

Communes of Far North Region (Cameroon)